Peter Lowe (born 17 June 1938) is an English artist. He was born in London at Victoria Park, Hackney. He studied at Goldsmiths College 1954–60 where he was taught by Mary Martin and Kenneth Martin. Lowe's work is rational, abstract and geometric. In 1960 he constructed and exhibited his first relief and experimented with balanced transformable constructions. His work is mainly exhibited and appreciated in Europe where it is in many national collections, Vienna mumok Sammlung Dieter und Gertraud Bogner, Muzeum Sztuki w Lodzi . In 1972 he cofounded Systems group. Since 1974 he has been a member of Arbeitskreis.

The constructivist work of Peter Lowe is mentioned in Alastair Grieve's authoritative book of 2005, and an interview with him by the art historian Alan Fowler is given in the Southampton City Art Gallery exhibition catalogue, 2008.

References

 Dictionnaire de la Peinture Anglaise et Americaine, Larousse 1991, 
 Grieve, Alastair Constructed Abstract Art in England After the Second World War: A Neglected Avant Garde, Yale University Press. 2005. 
 Jonneke Jobse. De Stijl Continued. The Journal Structure (1958–1964) An Artists' Debate. 010 Publishers, Rotterdam 2005. 
 Fowler, Alan, essay and interview with Peter Lowe in exhibition catalogue 'A Rational Aesthetic', Southampton City Art Gallery, 2008
  Correspondences Modern Art and Universalism, Muzeum Sztuki 2012

External links
Official website of the artist
The Cornelius Foundation
 Waterhouse and Dodd art brokers. London W1.
Tate Gallery Collection
 Fowler, Alan, essay Peter Lowe’s work, 2016

1938 births
English sculptors
English male sculptors
People from Hackney Central
Living people
Alumni of Goldsmiths, University of London
British abstract artists
Artists from London